Johannes "Jan" Kip (1652/53, Amsterdam – 1722, Westminster) was a Dutch draftsman, engraver and print dealer. Together with Leonard Knyff, he made a speciality of engraved views of English country houses.

Life
Kip was a pupil of Bastiaen Stopendaal (1636–1707), from 1668 to 1670, before setting up on his own; his earliest dated engravings are from 1672. In April 1680, at the age of 27, he married Elisabeth Breda in Amsterdam. After producing works for the court of William of Orange in Amsterdam, Kip followed William and Mary to London and settled in St. John Street in Farringdon, where he conducted a thriving printselling business. He also worked for various London publishers producing engravings after such artists as Francis Barlow (c. 1626–1704) and Caius Gabriel Cibber (1630–1700), largely for book illustrations. He made several engraved plates for Awnsham & John Churchill's A Collection of Voyages & Travels (first published 1704). He signed the African scenes in volume V of the 1732 edition as "J. Kip".

His most important works were the large fold-out folio illustrations for Britannia Illustrata, 1708; for the 65 folio plates he engraved for the antiquary Sir Robert Atkyns, The Ancient and Present State of Glostershire, 1712 (1st edition); and for Le Nouveau Théâtre de la Grande Bretagne ou description exacte des palais de la Reine, et des Maisons les plus considerables des des Seigneurs & des Gentilshommes de la Grande Bretagne, 1715, an extended reprint in collaboration with other artists.

Partnership with Leonard Knyff

The linked careers of Jan Kip and Leonard Knyff made a specialty of engraved views of English country houses, represented in detail from the bird's-eye view, a pictorial convention for topography. Their major work was Britannia Illustrata: Or Views of Several of the Queens Palaces, as Also of the Principal seats of the Nobility and Gentry of Great Britain, Curiously Engraven on 80 Copper Plates, London (1707, published in the winter of 1708–9). The volume is among the most important English topographical publications of the 18th century. Architecture is rendered with care, and the settings of parterres and radiating avenues driven through woods or planted across fields, garden paths, gates and toolsheds are illustrated in detail. The images are staffed with figures and horses, coaches pulling into forecourts, water-craft on rivers, in line with the traditions of the Low Countries. Some of the plates are in the Siennese "map perspective".

References

Further reading

Kip, Johannes et al. The history of nature, in two parts (1720).

External links

"Britannia Illustrata" and short biogs of Kip and Knyff ("Heatons of Tisbury)
Prints from "Britannia Illustrata" (The Philadelphia Print Shop Ltd.)
Johannes Kip - Biography (The Red House Collection)
Johannes Kip online (ArtCyclopedia)

1652 births
1722 deaths
Artists from Amsterdam
Dutch printmakers
Dutch cartographers
17th-century cartographers
17th-century Dutch people
Dutch emigrants to the Kingdom of England